Ellobium aurisjudae is a species of gastropods belonging to the family Ellobiidae.

The species is found in Eastern Asia, Malesia. It specifically can be found in mangrove forests and feeds on the leaf litter of Bruguiera parviflora.

References

Ellobiidae
Gastropods described in 1758
Taxa named by Carl Linnaeus
Gastropods of Asia
Mangrove fauna